Jahan-e Ketab   ( The World of Books in English) is a monthly literary magazine and a platform in Iran.

History and profile
Jahan-e Ketab was founded in 1995 in Tehran and is being published in the Persian language. The monthly magazine also focuses on neighboring countries. It publishes literary critic articles.

In 2001 Jahan-e Ketab was honored with one of the international Prince Claus Awards.

References
 

1995 establishments in Iran
Literary magazines published in Iran
Magazines established in 1995
Magazines published in Tehran
Monthly magazines published in Iran
Persian-language magazines